Patrick Holzer (born 23 March 1970) is an Italian former alpine skier.

Born at Sexten, he won a total of two World Cup races, one in Super-G and one in Giant Slalom.

World Cup results
Wins

References

External links
 

1970 births
Living people
People from Sexten
Italian male alpine skiers
Olympic alpine skiers of Italy
Alpine skiers at the 1992 Winter Olympics
Alpine skiers at the 1998 Winter Olympics
Germanophone Italian people
Alpine skiers of Centro Sportivo Carabinieri
Sportspeople from Südtirol